Aahaa..! is a 1998 Indian Telugu-language romance film produced by Nagarjuna Akkineni on Great India Entertainments and directed by Suresh Krissna. It stars  Jagapathi Babu, Sanghavi, Jayasudha, Raghuvaran, Bhanupriya and music composed by Vandemataram Srinivas. The film is remake of Krishna's own Tamil film Aahaa..!. The film released to positive reviews and won a South Filmfare Award.

Plot
Sriram is the son of "Pepsi" Parasuram, who always enjoys his life frolic and his father feels that he is a useless fellow. Raghuram, his elder brother is their father's favorite son. Raghuram is married to Rajeswari and has a son Ajay. Sriram falls in love with Janaki, the daughter of a cook Rama Rao. Parasuram opposes the match because of the difference in their status. Meanwhile, Raghu's college sweetheart, Gita is dying and she wants to spend her last days with him. She contacts him after five years and they begin meeting secretly. Sriram finds out about this and tries to keep the family secrets. Later at the moment of Gita dying Sriram takes her to the hospital. Viewing it, Parasuram felt she is Sriram's lover and felt ashamed. When Parasuram went to a sweet market he come to know it is the sweet marketer's daughter who loved Sriram. But as that girl is different from whom he saw he felt his son is a womanizer. To hide his brother's secret he takes the blame for everyone's shortcomings and becomes the family scapegoat and his father's favorite whipping boy. The rest of the film examines whether or not Raghu is finally vindicated in the eyes of his family.

Cast 

 Jagapati Babu as Sriram
 Sanghavi as Janaki
Jayasudha as Rajeswari
 Raghuvaran as Raghuram
Bhanupriya as Geeta
 Vijayakumar as Parasuram
 Chandra Mohan as Rama Rao
 Raghunatha Reddy as Viswanadham
 Ram Gopalan as Sitaram
 Sameer
 Rajiv Kanakala as Prashanth
 Gautam Raju as Govind
 Chitti Babu as Krishna
 Tirupathi Prakash as Ganapati
 Annapoorna as Parvati
 Varsha as Gayatri
 Radhabai as Parasuram's mother
 Madhavisri
 Uma Sharma
 Master Mahendra as Ajay
 Nagarjuna as narrator

Soundtrack 

Music composed by Vandemataram Srinivas. Lyrics were written by Sirivennela Sitarama Sastry. Music released on Aditya Music Company.

Production 
The cast features Vijayakumar and Raghuvaran reprising their roles from the original. Bhanupriya however, played Jayasudha's role in the original, while in the remake she played Sukanya's role.

Awards 
Filmfare Awards
 Filmfare Award for Best Male Playback Singer – Telugu (1998) – Vandemataram Srinivas – "Priyuraali Address"

References

External links 
 

1998 films
1990s Telugu-language films
Indian romantic drama films
1998 romantic drama films
Films directed by Suresh Krissna
Films scored by Vandemataram Srinivas
Telugu remakes of Tamil films